Diisopromine or disoprominum, usually as the hydrochloride salt, is a synthetic spasmolytic which neutralizes spastic conditions of the biliary tract and of the sphincter of Oddi. It was discovered at Janssen Pharmaceutica in 1955. It is sold in South Africa under the brand name Agofell syrup as a mixture with sorbitol, and elsewhere as Megabyl.

See also
Fenpiprane
Delucemine

References

Diisopropylamino compounds
Janssen Pharmaceutica
Belgian inventions
Drugs with unknown mechanisms of action
Aromatic compounds